Queen Tamara is a three-act play by Knut Hamsun about Tamar of Georgia. It was published in 1903.

Characters

 Tamara, Queen of Georgia
 Prince Giorgi, her husband
 Giorgi and Rusdan, their children
 The prior
 The abbot
 Fatimat, the queen's servant
 The khan of Tovin
 Zaidata
 Juanata
 Sofiat
 Mecedu
 Prince Giorgi's adjutant
 Two Tatar officers
 Two Georgian prisoners
 A hetman
 The queen's officers and soldiers, Tovin officers and soldiers, monks, scribes, musicians, dancers, girls, servants

Reception
Hamsun's play was poorly received. Reviews characterized it as uninteresting or even a failure, and Hamsun is considered to have known too little about the subject matter to convincingly develop the plot.

References

Works by Knut Hamsun
Norwegian plays
1903 plays